Lavelle is a rural locality in the Toowoomba Region, Queensland, Australia. In the  Lavelle had a population of 29 people.

History 
The locality was named after Martin Lavelle, a surveyor, who surveyed the Lavelle and surrounding areas in the 1880s.

Lavelle Provisional School opened on 4 May 1926. On 29 January 1936 it became Lavelle State School. It closed on 31 December 1957. It was on Kooroongarra Road at approx .

In the  Lavelle had a population of 29 people.

References 

Toowoomba Region
Localities in Queensland